Farewell in June (Russian:Proshchanie v iiune) is a full-length play in two acts by Alexander Vampilov.  The play was written in 1964, first published in Angaras No. 1, 1966 issue (Irkutsk), and premiered in 1966.

Plot
Biology student Nikolai Kolesov meets Tanya, the daughter of the rector of his university, Repnikov. His love for the young woman is put to the test by the proposal of Tanya's father to give up his feelings in exchange for a great academic career.

Characters
Nikolai Kolesov, biology student
Vasya Bukin, Kolesov's friend, geology student
Grisha Frolov, Kolesov's fellow student
Gomyra, Bukin's friend, geology student
Vladimir Alekseevich Repnikov, Tanya's father, rector of the university
Tanya, Repnikov's daughter
Zolotuyev, owner of a country house
Masha, biology student, Bukin's fiancée
Repnikova, Repnikov's wife 
milician
other students

References

Russian plays
1964 plays